Reston is a civil parish in the East Lindsey district of Lincolnshire, England.

It comprises the villages of North Reston, South Reston, and Castle Carlton.

References

External links

Civil parishes in Lincolnshire
East Lindsey District